Christian VI (30 November 1699 – 6 August 1746) was King of Denmark and Norway from 1730 to 1746. The eldest surviving son of Frederick IV and Louise of Mecklenburg-Güstrow, he is considered one of Denmark-Norway's more anonymous kings, but he was a skilled politician, best known for his authoritarian regime. He was the first king of the Oldenburg dynasty to refrain from entering in any war. During his reign both compulsory confirmation (1736) and a public, nationwide school system (1739) were introduced. His chosen motto was  "Deo et populo" (for God and the people).

Early years

Christian was born on 30 November 1699 at Copenhagen Castle as the second but eldest surviving son of King Frederick IV of Denmark by his first consort, Louise of Mecklenburg-Güstrow. His grandfather King Christian V had died just three months, before he was born, and he was thus crown prince from birth. From 1706, Christian came to understand Danish but used German for everyday speaking and writing. He got a better education and acquired more knowledge than his father and grandfather.

As Crown Prince he was allowed by his father to find a wife by himself. During a trip through Europe accompanied by Chancellor Ulrik Adolf Holstein, the Crown Prince decided on Sophie Magdalene of Brandenburg-Kulmbach, one of the ladies-in-waiting at the court of the Saxon-Polish queen Christiane Eberhardine in the Castle Pretzsch. Sophia Magdalene came from a minor margraviate (not greater than Lolland-Falster) of the Hohenzollern dynasty where able consciousness was inversely proportional to the funds; half of the land was mortgaged, and her father died young. She had 13 siblings and was considered an unequal match for the Danish prince, but the king gave his permission. In Christian's letters, he describes his feelings for the princess's intense religiosity, which reminded him of his own. They were married on 7 August 1721, while Christian was crown prince. The wedding was held at Pretzsch in Saxony.

Reign

At the death of Frederick IV on 12 October 1730, the couple became King and Queen of Denmark-Norway. They were crowned on 6 June 1731 in the Chapel of Frederiksborg Palace.

The king was shy and introverted by nature, and stayed away from the public. Christian's indignation at his father's bigamy and general promiscuity – the reason for the great sorrow of his late mother – led him to one of his first government actions: reversing his father's will and depriving widow Queen Anna Sophie, (Frederick IV's third wife if all "marriages" are counted, second wife if bigamous marriages excluded), of a large part of the wealth she had inherited before exiling her to the Clausholm estate, her childhood home.

For the first ten years of his government he consulted often with his cousin, Count Christian Ernst of Stolberg-Wernigerode.  The count took part in almost everything, from the dismissal of cooks in the Queen's kitchen to determining alliance policy. He encouraged the king as long as possible to maintain the English alliance, which led to the marriage between Louise, the daughter of George II of Great Britain with the king's elder son Frederick.

In 1733, the royal couple travelled to Norway. A poem/speech by Peter Höyer was performed in his honor when he visited the city of Trondheim on 18 July.

Christian's central domestic act was the introduction of the so-called adscription of 1733 (in Danish, stavnsbånd), a law that forced peasants to remain in their home regions, and by which the peasantry was subjected to both the local nobility and the army.  Though the idea behind this law was probably to secure a constant number of peasant soldiers, it later was widely regarded as the ultimate subjugation of the Danish peasantry, and damaged Christian VI's reputation. The act would later be abolished in 1788.

The Pietist views of King Christian influenced much of his ecclesiastical polity although both nobility and many common people secretly resisted the king's influence. This did not mean that it was without effect. It had an influence on much of the poetry of the age including that of hymn writer Hans Adolph Brorson (1694–1764). Another lasting result of the king's efforts was the introduction of mandatory confirmation in 1736. This required some level of literacy, thereby promoting the need for a common school system, which was created by decree in 1739.

There were numerous building activities connected to Christian VI, and he was probably the greatest Danish builder of the 18th century; his queen also made a notable effort.  Among their works are Christiansborg Palace (built 1732–1742, burned in 1794, rebuilt); Hirschholm Palace, a summer country retreat in North Zealand in current day Hørsholm municipality (built 1737–1739, demolished 1812); and the Eremitage (built 1734–1736, still standing).  For Crown Prince Frederik (V) was built the Prince's palace in Kalveboderne (built 1743–1744, still standing as the National Museum).  The construction of these expensive buildings was financed by Øresundstolden, with the purpose of representing the power and wealth of the Danish realm, but they also became an economic burden on the subjects.

Christian's foreign policy was a peaceful one and Denmark-Norway kept strictly neutral.  In both trade and commerce, it was an age of advancement; some new companies and banks were founded.  His plans to make their only daughter, Princess Louise, Queen of Sweden never came to fruition.  During the election of the heir to the Swedish throne, both the prince of Zweibrücken-Birkenfeld and the prince of Mecklenburg were considered as candidates to be heir to the childless King Frederick I of Sweden.  In 1743, Adolf Frederik of Holstein-Gottorp was elected Swedish heir.

Treaty of San Ildefonso
The Treaty of San Ildefonso of 1742, signed between Spain and Denmark-Norway, was a treaty of friendship, commerce and navigation by setting out the conditions that would govern commercial relations between the two countries. José del Campillo y Cossio on behalf of Philip V of Spain and Frederik Ludvig, Baron Dehn, by Christian VI, adjusted the agreement at the Royal Palace of La Granja de San Ildefonso on 18 July 1742. The treaty was never made effective: Spanish authorities considered that the exemption clause on half of the taxes for the import of Danish fish conflicted with other treaties with third countries, in which they were guaranteed preference in trade with Spain. In 1753 the agreement would be nullified.

Death

From his youth, Christian VI was sickly and chronically ill. On 6 August 1746 – the day before his silver marriage anniversary – the king died on Hirschholm Palace. Christian VI was interred in Roskilde Cathedral. The neoclassical memorial designed and produced by sculptor Johannes Wiedewelt was commissioned by the king's widow who upon his death.

The marble monument was completed in 1768, but not installed at Roskilde Cathedral until 1777. The monument includes a sarcophagus and two female figures, "Sorgen" ("Sorrow") and "Berømmelsen" ("Fame").  This was the first neoclassical sarcophagus in Denmark and is considered to mark the start of neoclassicism in that country.

Legacy

To posterity, Christian VI is known foremost as a religious ruler. He was deeply devoted to Pietism, and during his entire reign he tried to impart its teachings to his subjects. The religious pressure he imposed, along with his lack of personal charm, made him one of the most unpopular of Denmark-Norway's absolutist kings; but he was the first who never went to war nor was involved in war.

The cities of Kristiansund in Norway and Christiansted on Saint Croix are named for him.

Ancestry

References

Citations

Bibliography

External links

 The Royal Lineage at the website of the Danish Monarchy
 Christian VI at the website of the Royal Danish Collection at Rosenborg Castle

|-

Christian VI of Denmark
1746 deaths
18th-century Norwegian monarchs
Dukes of Schleswig
Dukes of Holstein
Denmark–Norway
Burials at Roskilde Cathedral
Counts of Oldenburg
18th-century monarchs of Denmark
1699 births